RoadRunner was a post-production firm based in Quezon City, Philippines. It is a division of Star Cinema. In addition to films, Roadrunner is also heavily engaged in the production of commercial advertisement for television, print and internet.

Notable projects
Some of the most notable projects undertaken by the firm are Puso ng Pasko (1998), Hiling (1998), Spirit Warriors (2000), Yamashita: The Tiger's Treasure (2001) (which earned Roadrunner a FAMAS Awards for best visual effects and best special effects), Spirit Warriors: The Shortcut (2003), Manoro (2006), Pisay (2007), Concerto (2008), Independencia (2009) the first Filipino film to be screened in the Un Certain Regard at the Cannes Film Festival, and RPG Metanoia (2010) the first feature length Filipino film to be presented in 3D.

In 2013, RoadRunner was merged to Star Cinema.

Awards

References

External links

Visual effects companies
Special effects companies
1989 establishments in the Philippines
Entertainment companies established in 1989
Entertainment companies disestablished in 2013
Companies based in Quezon City
Star Cinema